Hervé Oussalé (born 16 June 1988 in Tyialo) is a Burkinabé football player who is currently unattached.

Career 
Oussalé began his career with Les Etalons Juniors, then joined the juniors from Etoile Filante Ouagadougou where he played until July 2006. In July 2006, he moved to FC Brussels in Belgium where he played for the juniors for 18 months and was scouted by FC Red Bull Salzburg where he played in the reserve team. He left after six months and returned to Burkina Faso, signing a contract with Etoile Filante de Ouagadougou.

On 30 January 2009, he left Etoile Filante de Ouagadougou in the Burkinabé Premier League to join Alemannia Aachen in the 2. Bundesliga. Oussalé gave his debut on 6 February 2009 against FC Hansa Rostock. After one year, he left Alemannia Aachen and returned to Belgium, signing on for RAEC Mons on 8 January 2010.

He was invited to have a trial with Persepolis in the summer of 2010 and scored two goals in a friendly match. He joined Persepolis in July 2010.

On 6 July 2011, Oussalé signed an 18-month contract with Algerian club MC Alger. He made his debut for the club on 16 July 2011, as a starter in a 2011 CAF Champions League group stage match against Tunisian side Espérance.

International career 
Oussalé has played with the U-17 from Burkina Faso in the qualifications for the Coupe d’Afrique des Nations Cadets 2005 in Gambia and was promoted in 2006 to the Senior National Team.

References

1988 births
Alemannia Aachen players
Algerian Ligue Professionnelle 1 players
ASO Chlef players
Association football forwards
Burkina Faso international footballers
Burkinabé expatriate sportspeople in Algeria
Burkinabé footballers
Étoile Filante de Ouagadougou players
Expatriate footballers in Algeria
Expatriate footballers in Austria
Expatriate footballers in Belgium
Expatriate footballers in Germany
Expatriate footballers in Iran
R.W.D.M. Brussels F.C. players
FC Red Bull Salzburg players
Living people
MC Alger players
Persepolis F.C. players
R.A.E.C. Mons players
2. Bundesliga players
Burkinabé expatriate sportspeople in Austria
Burkinabé expatriate sportspeople in Germany
Burkinabé expatriate sportspeople in Belgium
Burkinabé expatriate sportspeople in Iran
Tala'ea El Gaish SC players
Burkinabé expatriate sportspeople in Egypt